Cretton is a surname. Notable people with the surname include:

Destin Daniel Cretton (born 1978), American film director, screenwriter, producer, and editor
Eduardo Cretton (born 1995), Chilean lawyer 
Jean Philippe Cretton (born 1985),  Chilean television presenter and journalist